MandM Direct is a British online fashion retailer based in the United Kingdom.It sells its products exclusively over the Internet and was the second largest online fashion retailer in the UK in 2010-s. It specializes in buying clearance stock from manufacturers and selling at discounted prices. They stock over 150 brands including Adidas, Timberland, Diesel and Puma.

History
The company was started as M and M Sports in 1987 by Mark Ellis and Martin Churchward.

Following a buy-out by private equity group ECI Partners in 2004 the company’s identity changed to MandM Direct in order to reflect their move into selling fashion and lifestyle brands.

In 2007 US private equity group, TA Associates completed major investment and the logistics operation moved to new warehousing in Herefordshire.

2009 saw expansion into Europe which led to German language and later French language sites being created.

In 2014, according to the reports, Danish fashion group Bestseller purchased MandM Direct Ltd for £140 million ($235 million). 

The company was a back-of-the-shirt sponsor for Hereford United until 2012.

MandM Direct are an official partner of Teenage Cancer Trust and has raised over 1.5 million pounds.

Location

The company headquarters is in Leominster, Herefordshire, with the main warehouse facility being based at Moreton-on-Lugg just off the A49.

Brands

 Ben Sherman
 Asics
 Jack and Jones
 Board Angels
 Kangaroo Poo
 Mad Wax
 Penguin
 Onfire
 Diesel
 Trespass
 Adidas
 Bench
 Voi Jeans
 Converse
 UGG 
 Fred Perry
 Firetrap
 Animal
 Arena
 Speedo
 Puma
 Lyle and Scott
 Levi Strauss & Co
 New Balance
 Jack Wills
 Hunter

References

External links

Companies based in Herefordshire
Retail companies established in 1987
British brands
Online clothing retailers of the United Kingdom